Cristina Chirichella (born 10 February 1994) is an Italian volleyball player who competed at the 2014 World Championship and 2016 Summer Olympics.

Career
Chirichella played with her national team at the 2014 World Championship. There, her team finished the tournament in fourth place after losing the bronze medal match 2-3 to Brazil.
She won the 2016 World Olympic qualification tournament Best Middle Blocker award. She was selected to play the Italian League All-Star game in 2017.

Awards

Individuals
 2016 World Olympic qualification tournament "Best  Middle Blocker"

Clubs
 2015 Italian Cup (Coppa Italia) —  Champions, with AGIL Novara
 2017 Italian Supercup -  Champions, with AGIL Novara
 2016-17 Italian Championship —  Champions, with AGIL Novara
 2018 Italian Cup (Coppa Italia) —  Champions, with AGIL Novara
 2019 Italian Cup (Coppa Italia) —  Champions, with AGIL Novara
 2018–19 CEV Champions League -  Champions, with AGIL Novara

References

1994 births
Olympic volleyball players of Italy
Volleyball players at the 2016 Summer Olympics
Living people
Italian women's volleyball players
Sportspeople from Naples
Volleyball players at the 2020 Summer Olympics
Serie A1 (women's volleyball) players